Espen Ruud (born 26 February 1984) is a Norwegian football defender who plays for Odd.

Club career
He joined the Odd Grenland from local team Hei in 2003. Ruud established himself in the Odd squad by 2005.

International career
Ruud has 35 caps for his country on youth level including 13 caps for Norway U-21, and received his first call-up to the senior squad for the Euro 2008 qualifiers against Malta and Hungary.

He made his debut for Norway in a friendly match against Switzerland on 14 November 2009, and scored his first goal for Norway in a friendly match against Northern Ireland on 29 February 2012. Ruud received the Gold Watch after his 25th cap against Switzerland on 12 October 2012.

Career statistics

International goals

References

External links
 OB Profile

1984 births
Living people
Norwegian footballers
Norway international footballers
Odds BK players
Odense Boldklub players
Eliteserien players
Danish Superliga players
Norwegian expatriate footballers
Expatriate men's footballers in Denmark
Norwegian expatriate sportspeople in Denmark
Sportspeople from Porsgrunn

Association football midfielders
Association football defenders